German submarine U-3505 was a Type XXI submarine of Nazi Germany's Kriegsmarine during World War II. The U-boat was laid down on 9 July 1944 at the Schichau-Werke yard at Danzig, launched on 25 August 1944, and commissioned on 7 October 1944 under the command of Oberleutnant zur See Horst Willner.

Design
Like all Type XXI U-boats, U-3505 had a displacement of  when at the surface and  while submerged. The submarine was powered by two MAN SE supercharged six-cylinder M6V40/46KBB diesel engines each providing , two Siemens-Schuckert GU365/30 double-acting electric motors each providing , and two Siemens-Schuckert silent running GV232/28 electric motors each providing .

U-3505 was fitted with six  torpedo tubes in the bow and four  C/30 anti-aircraft guns. She could carry twenty-three torpedoes or seventeen torpedoes and twelve mines. The complement was five officers and fifty-two men.

Service history
Although never used in combat, the submarine achieved some degree of fame due to a rescue mission. Her commander, Captain Horst Willner, disguised his wife as a sailor and smuggled her aboard together with their three-month-old baby (a crime punishable by death).

After leaving Danzig they went to Gotenhafen, where they took on board 110 children and adolescents. The refugees, including the captain's family, were safely delivered at Travemünde, Lübeck on 2 April 1945.

Returning to Kiel, U-3505 was to participate in torpedo exercises, but on 3 April was sunk in a bombing raid while in harbour. At least one sailor was killed.

References

Bibliography

External links
An Incredible Rescue Against All Orders U-3505 and the Children of Hela.
 

Type XXI submarines
U-boats commissioned in 1944
U-boats sunk in 1945
World War II submarines of Germany
1944 ships
Ships built in Danzig
U-boats sunk by US aircraft
Ships built by Schichau
Maritime incidents in April 1945